Desh is a region adjacent to the Western Ghats between the Godavari River and  Krishna River, a part of Deccan Plateau, in the states of Maharashtra, Karnataka, and Andhra Pradesh. The region is hilly and slopes towards the east, and is drained by the upper reaches of the Godavari and Krishna rivers and their tributaries. 

In the context of the history of Maharashtra, "Desh" is an abbreviation for "Maharashtra-desh", that historical region of the west-central Deccan Plateau that is called the Division of Pune. Marathwada came to be called separately because it had been conquered by the Nizam of Hyderabad as part of the former Princely state of Hyderabad.

The Desh region was the birthplace and core of the Maratha Empire, founded by Chhatrapati Shivaji Maharaj in the 17th century, and is home to a number of cities, like Satara and Pune, associated with the Maratha Empire history. The region came under British rule in 1818, at the conclusion of the Third Anglo-Maratha War. Most of the region was ruled directly by the British as part of the Bombay Presidency, but several princely states, including Satara, Sangli, and Kolhapur, remained under Maratha rulers in subsidiary alliance with the British. Satara was annexed by the British in 1848. After Indian Independence in 1947, Bombay Presidency became the Indian state of Bombay. Bombay state was divided into the states of Maharashtra, Karnataka, and Gujarat in 1960.

Politics
Politics in Paschim Maharashtra is linked with the cooperative movement. Most of the sugar cooperative factories in western Maharashtra work as power centers and play a major role in politics. Sangli District has a major political climate in the region.

References

Regions of Maharashtra